Bishop of Helsinki may refer to the diocesan bishop of one of these Finnish dioceses, each with its see in Helsinki:
 Evangelical Lutheran Diocese of Helsinki
 Roman Catholic Diocese of Helsinki
 Finnish Orthodox Diocese of Helsinki, Finland (see Finnish Orthodox Church).